Simon Stürm (born 24 April 1973) is a Swiss rower. He competed at the 1996 Summer Olympics, 2000 Summer Olympics and the 2004 Summer Olympics.

References

External links
 

1973 births
Living people
Swiss male rowers
Olympic rowers of Switzerland
Rowers at the 1996 Summer Olympics
Rowers at the 2000 Summer Olympics
Rowers at the 2004 Summer Olympics
Sportspeople from Lucerne